The Vanguard Justice Society is a non-profit organization based in Baltimore, Maryland, representing the Baltimore Police Department's African American police officers. Founded in 1971, the organization's goals include:

 The promotion of Justice, Fairness and Effectiveness in Law Enforcement and the legality of action taken.
 To establish and maintain positive relations between the police and the community.
 To educate police officers so that we perform with professionalism, pride and sensitivity.
 To aid in the enlistment of qualified African Americans into the Law Enforcement profession.

The organization is currently led by Lt. Colonel Rick Hite, commander of the department's Youth Services Division.

References

External links 
Vanguard Justice Society
Baltimore Police Department

Baltimore Police Department
African-American history in Baltimore
African Americans' rights organizations
African-American law enforcement organizations